Palepai, described by generations of foreign ethnographers and collectors as "ship cloths" because of the predominance of a ship motif, were said to represent the "ship of the dead."  In Sumatra these cloths are also called sesai balak ("big wall"). No convincing field data were ever collected from 19th century weavers or traditional owners about the iconography. Since then, there has been great loss of Lampung traditional knowledge. The history of these ships cloth is obscure and the reasons for both their original use and their decline remain conjectural. . The factors that are presumed to have caused this include the abolition of slavery in 1859, the decline in the pepper trade and changing marriage traditions. Two lesser known forms are the tatibin and the tampan maju. The tatibin  are similar in design to the single ship palepai but are smaller, not exceeding 1.5 M. The tampan maju beaded and also shorter than the large cloths. Only 12 examples of tampan maju are known to exist.

Design elements

No two Palepai are identical, however their designs fall into four main groups.

A large ship stretching the entire length of the cloth as is seen in the image above.
Two large red ships, an example of which can be seen in the Textile Arts Collection.
Two or three rows of stylized human figures extending along the length of the cloth, an example of which is in the art collection of the Powerhouse Museum in Sydney.
Four or more discrete panels. These panels are usually of the same composition, an example of which is in the collection of the Art Gallery of New South Wales.

As little is known about the meaning of the design elements of the ships cloth we have to conjecture from ethnographic parallels.

Uses
The use of palepai is the prerogative of those of the penyimbang rank in the complex social structure of the Paminggir people. These textiles are used at many ceremonies of the life cycle. In ceremonies the palepai was hung on the right wall of an inner room of the house as a backdrop for the central figure in the rite. In the marriage ceremony  this is the bride who sits in front of the cloth of her husband-to be, after arriving in an elaborately bedecked procession. On the bride's first visit home after the wedding ceremony the cloth may have been hung. And then again, shortly after the birth when the first child is presented to the maternal grandparents to receive a name. The cloth is also hung at the celebration of a boy's circumcision and at funerals.  For the Paminggir nobility the presence of the large palepai was also essential at ceremonies pronouncing the rank of the owner.

Technical features
The designs are executed by a continuous and discontinuous supplementary wefts on a plain cotton weave foundation. A supplementary weave weft is an additional weft element inserted between two of the regular foundation wefts. The major dyes used were most probably the same as those used in the manufacture of women's sarongs in the area.  Sepang (Caesalpinia sappan) and tamarind for the red, turmeric and tamarind for the yellow, and indigo and lime for the blue. The complexity of the organization of any one cloth is enormous,  and even though we can only guess at the technicalities involved, if the reader needs more information this is available online.

Rarity
These cloths have not been woven in a century and few exemplars can be found today. It is estimated that there are only 100 to 150 palepai of all kinds still in existence.

References

Citations

Bibliography

Further reading
 Gillow, John (1992). Traditional Indonesian Textiles. Thames and Hudson. .

External links
 Textile Arts Collection Acquires Important Indonesian Ship Cloth
 Powerhouse Museum Collection item A1055
 Palepai (ceremonial hanging) with design of four ships
 Palepai Maju in The Metropolitan Museum of Art

Textile arts of Indonesia
Lampung
Weaving